This is a list of Algerian football transfers in the 2020 summer transfer window by club. Clubs in the 2020–21 Algerian Ligue Professionnelle 1 are included.

Ligue Professionnelle 1

AS Ain M'lila

In:

Out:

ASO Chlef

In:

Out:

CA Bordj Bou Arreridj

In:

Out:

CR Belouizdad

In:

Out:

CS Constantine

In:

Out:

ES Sétif

In:

Out:

JS Kabylie

In:

Out:

JS Saoura

In:

Out:

MC Alger

In:

Out:

MC Oran

In:

Out:

NA Hussein Dey

In:

Out:

NC Magra

In:

Out:

Paradou AC

In:

Out:

US Biskra

In:

Out:

USM Bel Abbès

In:

Out:

Olympique de Médéa

In:

Out:

JSM Skikda

In:

Out:

WA Tlemcen

In:

Out:

RC Relizane

In:

Out:

USM Alger

In:

 

Out:

References

Algeria
Lists of Algerian football transfers
2020–21 in Algerian football